The Governor of Londonderry and Culmore was a British military appointment. The Governor was the officer who commanded the garrison and fortifications of the city of Derry and of Culmore fort. The Governor was paid by The Honourable The Irish Society.

Governors of Londonderry and Culmore

1603–1606: The 1st Baron Docwra of Culmore
1606–1608: Sir George Paulet
1611–1643: Sir John Vaughan
1643–1644: Sir Robert Stewart
1644–1645: Colonel Audley Mervyn
1645–1648: Thomas Folliott, 2nd Baron Folliott
1648–1649: The 2nd Earl of Mountrath
1649–?: Robert Venables (left Ireland 1654)
1660–1661: Sir Robert Stewart  (d. c.1670) (second term) 
1661–: Colonel John Gorges
1678–1688: John Skeffington, 2nd Viscount Massereene
1688–1689: Colonel Robert Lundy (deserted 1689)
1689: Sir George Walker / Henry Baker (died 1689)(jointly)
1690: John Mitchelburne
1691–1699: Sir Matthew Bridges
1699–1714: Clotworthy Skeffington, 3rd Viscount Massereene
1714–1719: Thomas Meredyth
1719–1734?: Henry Barry, 3rd Baron Barry of Santry
1735?–1737: Lieutenant-General Owen Wynne
1737–1739: Lieutenant-General Thomas Pearce
1739–1740: Charles Cathcart, 8th Lord Cathcart
1745–1749: Lieutenant-General Phineas Bowles
1749–1756: Lieutenant-General Henry Cornewall
1756–1774: Lieutenant-General Sir Robert Rich, 5th Bt
1774–1775: General Sir George Augustus Eliott
1775–1776: General Sir John Irwin
1776–1806: John Hale
1806: General The 1st Baron Hutchinson
1806–1820: General The 15th Earl of Suffolk
1820–1832: Lieutenant-General George Vaughan Hart, M.P. 
1832–1860: Field Marshal The 1st Earl of Strafford

References

History of Derry (city)
British military appointments
Military history of County Londonderry
Londonderry